Giulia Millanta is an Italian born folk rock, Americana singer-songwriter based in Austin, Texas.

Vocalist and guitarist, she also plays baritone guitar, ukulele and sings in four languages (English, Italian, Spanish and French).

She has been described by Michael Greenblatt on The Aquarian Weekly as being "deeply evocative with a dash of Piaf, a sprinkle of Lady Day, a pinch of Norah Jones and a teaspoon of Madeleine Peyroux." "She has been called smart, eclectic, adventurous and cool, and credited with psychedelic grooveability whilst 'baring her clairvoyant soul' to 'deliver musical mojo'".

She has released six solo albums to date and regularly tours throughout the US and Europe.

Early life 
Giulia was born in Florence, Italy and started playing the guitar at an early age when her father showed her the first few chords and taught her how to play some traditional songs.

At the age of thirteen, a life-threatening horse accident caused her to spend a month and a half in the hospital to recover from a coma due to a skull fracture. That event left a mark and, even though she was just a little girl, she promised herself she would always live her life at the fullest.

Curious and somehow restless, she has always had an inclination to travel and explore the world. She first moved to the mountains in Tuscany to work as a horse trainer and touring guide. Then she spent a year and a half in Barcelona, Spain (2005–2006) playing music and busking. Returned in Florence, she got her degree in general Medicine, summa cum laude, from the University of Florence in 2007, but never practiced the profession.

In her late twenties, she started performing in bars and clubs and she began to write her own songs.

Career 
In 2008 Giulia signed with the florentine label Cavern Jatt Records and debuted with "Giulia and the Dizzyness" an electronic-folk-experimental project featuring some of most talented Italian musicians such as Mario Arcari (Fossati), Matteo Addabbo, Ettore Bonafè.

Performing at the Acoustic Guitar Meeting in Sarzana in the spring of 2010 her "accomplished guitar style and songs" earned her the "New Sounds of Acoustic Music" award. This led to an endorsement by the guitar makers Eko, choice of the most famous 60's-80's era singer-songwriters throughout Italy.

In 2011 under her own DIY label, Ugly Cat Music, she wrote, produced and released "Dropping Down" distributed internationally by Audioglobe, featuring, among others, the outstanding talents of Michael Manring and the Grammy Award winning guitarist Ed Gerhard.

By 2012, after having toured mainland Europe, Giulia moved to Austin, Tx and released "Dust and Desire" (Ugly Cat Music/Audioglobe) featuring and co-produced by guitar player David Pulkingham (Patty Griffin, Robert Plant). With Pulkingham and percussionist Michael Longoria she also started a band called The Texas Magpies and released a cover record in 2013.

In 2014 she released "The Funambulist" (Ugly Cat Music), a concept album about life in between two continents and cultures. "The Funambulist" was enthusiastically received by audience and critics.

Dave Marsh said about her: “The best and scariest thing about Giulia Millanta is not just that she is truly a tightrope walker herself but that she continually pulls you out there with her... with melodies, singing, stories, imagery. No matter what language her lyrics may be in... and I’ve lost count of how many her lyrics use here... she’s always understandable because her music is, like any fine art, universally recognizable. I can’t wait for her next one!”

2016 is the year of her fifth solo album Moonbeam Parade (Ugly Cat Music/ internationally distributed by Shellshock), 13 new tunes. The album was also positively reviewed by Jeff Burger who defined it "eclectic, adventurous, well-sung CD" and included in the top ten Americana Records of 2016 by Classicalite.

Between 2016 and 2018 Giulia has continued to travel and tour in the United States, the United Kingdom and mainland Europe sharing the stage with world artists like Bruce Channel (author of the famous "Hey! Baby" featured in the movie Dirty Dancing), Spooner Oldham (keyboard player featured on many Aretha Franklin’s records), Jaston Williams (writer and performer of Greater Tuna), Hamell on Trial (New York City based punk-folk hero) and many more…

In 2018 Giulia releases Conversation with a Ghost produced by Giulia herself together with guitar player Gabriel Rhodes (Willie Nelson, Billy Joe Shaver). The record was recorded live with some of the best musicians in Austin and that in the past two years have become her steady band members: Glenn Fukunaga on bass, Dony Wynn (Robert Palmer) on drums. Featuring talents like Marc Ribot (Tom Waits) on electric guitar, Joel Guzman (Paul Simon) on accordion and John Mills (Aretha Franklin, David Byrne) on horns, David Pulkingham (Patty Griffin) on guitar, Kimmie Rhodes on background vocals.

Also, in December 2018 Giulia was awarded the Premio Ciampi, an Italian national music contest that takes place annually in Livorno since 1995 organized by the cultural association "Premio Ciampi". The main competition is reserved for unpublished songs. A prize is also awarded for the best cover of a song by Piero Ciampi, while there is an award for the best record debut of the year and a career award. The award ceremony takes place in October in Livorno within a program of concerts and cultural initiatives lasting a few days. Giulia won the prize for "Not You", her version of Piero Ciampi’s song "Tu no".

After 2 years of collaborations and after touring extensively in the US and Northern Europe, Giulia returns in the studio in early 2020 to record a new album.
“Tomorrow is a Bird”, once again co-produced with guitar player and polo-instrumentalist Gabriel Rhodes, features some of the most influential musicians in the Austin music scene.

A self-published  book entitled “Between the Strings” explores  the other side of being a musicians, her life on and off the road,  and marks Giulia’s debut as a writer. 

In the summer/fall of 2021 Giulia records “Woman on the Moon” (out in April of 2022)
The record which was almost entirely performed by Giulia and Gabriel with the exception of drum parts, is a journey of separation and unity, through the masculine and feminine inside of us.

She has shared the stage with historical rock band  10,000 Maniacs  and was selected for an Official Showcase at Folk Alliance International 2022  in Kansas City.

In the Spring of 2022, Giulia publishes her first novel “Fratture” with an Italian publishing company names Porto Seguro.

Discography 
2008 – Giulia and the Dizzyness (Cavern Jatt Records)

2011 – Dropping Down (Ugly Cat Music/Audioglobe)

2012 – Dust and Desire (Ugly Cat Music)

2014 – The Funambulist (Ugly Cat Music)

2016 – Moonbeam Parade (Ugly Cat Music/Shellshock)

2018 – Conversation with a Ghost (Ugly Cat Music/Audioglobe)

2020- "Tomorrow is a Bird" (Ugly Cat Music)

2022- "Woman on the Moon" (Ugly Cat Music)

See also 
 Music of Austin

References 

Year of birth missing (living people)
Living people
Musicians from Austin, Texas